Bilton (or Bilton-in-Holderness) is a village and civil parish in the East Riding of Yorkshire, England. According to the 2011 UK census, Bilton parish had a population of 2,220, a decrease on the 2001 UK census figure of 2,340.

The civil parish of Bilton consists of the villages of Bilton, Ganstead and Wyton.

St Peter's Church is a Grade II listed building that was designed by G. T. Andrews and built in 1851.

Bilton Community Primary School is situated in Bilton and provides primary education for about 300 pupils from the village and the surrounding area.

A  site is to be used to construct the biggest solar farm in the UK since 2016. The farm is to be built by Gridserve on behalf of Warrington Borough Council.

References

External links

Bilton Community Primary School

Villages in the East Riding of Yorkshire
Holderness
Civil parishes in the East Riding of Yorkshire